Westland Mansion was the home of Grover Cleveland, the 22nd and 24th President of the United States, from his retirement in 1897 until his death in 1908. The house is located in the historic district of Princeton, New Jersey, and is a National Historic Landmark also known as the Grover Cleveland Home.

History
The house was built by Robert F. Stockton in 1856. The National Park Service describes the original house, patterned after Morven (a nearby 18th-century mansion also owned by Robert Stockton) as a "2-1/2-story, stone structure covered with stucco painted yellow, [with] twin parlors on the first floor, spacious rooms, high ceilings, and handsome marble mantelpieces."

Stockton, who hailed from a prominent political family, was a United States Senator and naval commodore, notable for the capture of California during the Mexican–American War. Stockton's grandfather, Judge Richard Stockton, was a signer of the Declaration of Independence. The original structure consisted of a three-story main residence on roughly 4.5 acres of expansive lawns and fruit orchards. Later, a small wing extending from the rear of the residence was added to house servant's quarters and stables. The wing extension is now a separate home and is separated by a wall at the back of the house. Westland was originally entered from a stone roadway off of Bayard Lane (now Route 206). Nicely kept paths intersected the broad lawn, which was shaded by an assortment of massive pines. At the rear of the house was an orchard of pear and cherry trees and a dovecote to house pigeons and doves.

Purchased by Cleveland after his second term as president in 1896, the former chief executive lived there from 1897 until his death in 1908. Cleveland named it "Westland" in honor of his friend Andrew Fleming West, a humanities professor at Princeton University who assisted Cleveland in securing the purchase of the home. During Cleveland's occupancy several changes were made to the residence. He added a two-story extension to the right side of the home, with the lower floor serving as his billiard room. Cleveland also made some cosmetic changes to the building's façade in the Italianate style popular at the time.

Cleveland enjoyed his retirement at Westland. Although he had never attended college, he accepted a seat on the Board of Trustees of Princeton University, a position he took seriously, chairing a committee to establish a graduate school. He gave a series of four well-attended lectures at the university, which were later published as a book. The students were fond of Cleveland, serenaded him on his birthdays and, after football games, led victory parades to his home. He also took an active part in the life of the town, maintained a brisk correspondence with friends, and kept socially and politically active. His favorite recreations were billiards and meetings of the Poverty Club, composed of a group of his comrades who played cards regularly at Westland. He died at Westland in 1908 and is buried in Princeton Cemetery. Cleveland's widow, Frances, continued to reside in the house for many years after his death.

Current use
Always a privately owned residence, the renovated building currently sits on one and a half acres. The 6,345 square foot three-level house is described as having 6 bedrooms and 5 baths, a formal entry, and dining and living rooms that still contain trim from Cleveland's time there. The grounds include a formal garden, pool and garage. In 2015, it sold for $4,325,000. It is not open to the public.

See also 
 National Register of Historic Places listings in Mercer County, New Jersey
 List of residences of presidents of the United States

References

External links

 

National Historic Landmarks in New Jersey
Presidential homes in the United States
Houses in Princeton, New Jersey
Grover Cleveland
National Register of Historic Places in Mercer County, New Jersey
New Jersey Register of Historic Places
Historic district contributing properties in Mercer County, New Jersey
Individually listed contributing properties to historic districts on the National Register in New Jersey